Ivar Johansson (1899–1994) was a Swedish politician. He was a member of the Centre Party.

References
This article was initially translated from the Swedish Wikipedia article.

Centre Party (Sweden) politicians
1899 births
Year of death missing
Members of the Första kammaren
20th-century Swedish politicians